Ratu Josateki Sovau (born Nadi,  1951 – April 2005) was a Fijian rugby union player, coach and Taukei Naua. He played as a prop.

Career
His first international cap for Fiji was during a match against New Zealand Māori, at Christchurch, on 25 July 1970. He retired from the national team after a match against Tonga, at Suva, on 8 September 1979.

Coach career
During the 1987 Rugby World Cup, with George Simpkin as technical advisor, Sovau coached the Fiji national team. Under his guidance, Fiji qualified for the quarter-finals, causing a major upset by beating the Pumas 28–9 before losing to Italy by three points (15–18) and to New Zealand 13–74.

Notes

External links
Jo Sovau international statistics

Fijian rugby union players
Fijian rugby union coaches
Rugby union coaches
Sportspeople from Nadi
1951 births
2005 deaths
Fiji international rugby union players
Rugby union props
I-Taukei Fijian people